Abel Ram (1753–1830) was an Anglo-Irish landowner and politician. He was the son of Andrew Ram and Mary Digby, daughter of John Digby of County Kildare.

He married Elizabeth Stopford, daughter of Captain Joseph Stopford, and niece of James Stopford, 1st Earl of Courtown.

Career
He was a Member of Parliament (MP) for Duleek in the Irish Parliament from 1783 to 1790 and County Wexford from 1797 to 1800. His uncle, also Abel Ram, was the patron of Duleek. Ram was an MP for County Wexford from 1801 to 1806 and 1807 to 1812 in the United Kingdom Parliament after the 1800 Acts of Union,  sitting in the interest of his wife's family.

References

1753 births
1830 deaths
18th-century Anglo-Irish people
19th-century Anglo-Irish people
18th-century Irish landowners
Politicians from County Wicklow
Members of the Parliament of Ireland (pre-1801) for County Meath constituencies
Members of the Parliament of the United Kingdom for County Wexford constituencies (1801–1922)
Irish MPs 1783–1790
Irish MPs 1798–1800
UK MPs 1801–1802
UK MPs 1802–1806
UK MPs 1807–1812
19th-century Irish landowners